Jetstar Airways Pty Ltd, operating as Jetstar, is an Australian low-cost airline (self-described as "value-based") headquartered in Melbourne. It is a wholly owned subsidiary of Qantas, created in response to the threat posed by airline Virgin Blue. Jetstar is part of Qantas' two brand strategy of having Qantas Airways for the premium full-service market and Jetstar for the low-cost market. Jetstar carries 8.5% of all passengers travelling in and out of Australia.

The airline operates an extensive domestic network as well as regional and international services from its main base at Melbourne Airport, using a mixed fleet of the Airbus A320 family and the Boeing 787 Dreamliner. Like its Qantas parent, Jetstar competes with Virgin Australia.

Qantas, through the Jetstar Group, also has stakes in sister airlines Jetstar Asia Airways and Jetstar Japan.

History
The airline was established by Qantas in 2001 as a low-cost domestic subsidiary, under then-CEO Bruce Buchanan. Qantas had previously acquired Impulse Airlines on 20 November 2001 and operated it under the QantasLink brand, but following the decision to launch a low-cost carrier, re-launched the airline under the Jetstar brand. Domestic passenger services began on 25 May 2004, soon after the sale of tickets for its inaugural flight in February 2004. International services to Christchurch, New Zealand, commenced on 1 December 2005. Although owned by Qantas, its management operates largely independent of Qantas through the company formerly known as Impulse Airlines.

Originally the airline was headquartered on the grounds of Avalon Airport near Melbourne, and started flying out of Avalon Airport in mid-2004, but has since relocated its registered office to the Melbourne CBD.

Despite its low-cost ethos, Jetstar currently offers a limited number of connecting services without through baggage checking – though this has changed since international flights commenced in November 2006. Baggage connectivity was added as a service offering for domestic flights connecting with international flights.

Reserved seating is currently provided on all routes and on 4 October 2006, Jetstar became the first Australian airline to allow customers to select their seat upon booking. Sister airline Jetstar Asia Airways took off from its Singapore hub to Hong Kong on 13 December 2004. This marked Qantas' entry into the Asian low-cost market and signified its intention to battle key competitor Singapore Airlines on its home ground. Qantas has a 49% stake in Jetstar Asia's ownership.

On 1 December 2005, Jetstar commenced operations from Sydney, Melbourne, Brisbane and the Gold Coast to Christchurch in New Zealand. On 7 December 2005, it was announced that Jetstar would establish the world's first global low-cost airline. At the end of 2005, it was announced that Jetstar would fly to Perth, from Avalon Airport.

In July 2006, Jetstar and Jetstar Asia were brought together under the "Jetstar" brand. Online bookings for both carriers were integrated into Jetstar.com.

In July 2007, Qantas acquired an 18% stake in Vietnam's Pacific Airlines, to increase to 30% by 2010. The airline was relaunched on 23 May 2008 as Jetstar Pacific.

On 1 August 2008, Jetstar announced that it had signed an agreement with the Northern Territory Government to make Darwin International Airport an international hub with plans for seven aircraft to be based in Darwin. Under the agreement, Jetstar would be required to base three aircraft at Darwin by June 2009, with a further four by June 2012, with the Northern Territory Government to provide $5 million to set up the hub and a further $3 million for promotion of the new routes. In December 2013, Jetstar announced that it would be closing the Darwin base in May 2014 and re-positioning the based aircraft to Adelaide. Flights to Tokyo via Manila were to be discontinued while services to Singapore would be operated by Jetstar Asia with Singapore-based aircraft. The base closure was attributed to cost-cutting measures by parent company Qantas as well as increased competition from the re-introduction of flights by Asian carriers into Darwin airport.

On 28 April 2009, Jetstar commenced daily direct services from Auckland to the Gold Coast and Sydney. On 10 June 2009, Jetstar commenced domestic New Zealand flights between Auckland, Wellington, Christchurch, and Queenstown using Airbus A320 aircraft; services to Dunedin commenced later. Jetstar replaced Qantas subsidiary Jetconnect on these routes.

From 1 February 2011, Jetstar started its co-operation with the oneworld alliance, allowing people booking an itinerary with a full oneworld member to include a Jetstar flight in the itinerary. However, the flight must be sold via Jetstar's corporate parent Qantas, under a QF flight number.

In August 2011, Jetstar's parent Qantas announced that it would set up a new airline to be called Jetstar Japan, a joint venture of Jetstar, Japan Airlines, and Mitsubishi. The airline was expected to start operating in December 2012, but then launched ahead of schedule on 3 July 2012.

In March 2012, another Asian Jetstar branded airline was announced, Jetstar Hong Kong, a strategic partnership between Qantas and China Eastern Airlines, which was expected to commence operations in 2013. Although it took delivery of aircraft, Jetstar Hong Kong never commenced operations due to a revoked licence application.

In November 2013, Jetstar moved its head office from Melbourne's CBD to the suburb of Collingwood. In February 2014, Jetstar signed a codeshare agreement with Emirates Airlines as a continuation of the agreement between Emirates and Qantas, Jetstar's parent airline.

In mid-2014, the Australian Competition and Consumer Commission (ACCC) took legal action against Jetstar and competitor Virgin Australia in respect of drip pricing. In November 2015 the Federal Court of Australia found that the ACCC's claims that the two airlines engaged in misleading and deceptive conduct by carrying out drip pricing were proven. In September 2022, The Qantas Group has appointed Stephanie Tully as the new CEO of Jetstar.

New Zealand operations
In June 2015, Jetstar announced that it would commence regional services in New Zealand, beginning in December 2015. The new services would be flown by five turboprops Bombardier Dash 8s operated by Eastern Australia Airlines—one of Qantas' subsidiary regional airlines—under the Jetstar brand. At least four new destinations would be served initially, with Hamilton, Rotorua, New Plymouth, Napier, Palmerston North, Nelson and Invercargill named as the cities under consideration. On 31 August 2015, Jetstar announced it had selected the first four regional centres it would serve at the commencement of operations on 1 December; these were Napier, Nelson, New Plymouth, and Palmerston North. All four cities had services to Auckland; Nelson also had services to Wellington.

Jetstar announced in November 2019 that they would be ceasing all of their regional routes in New Zealand because the routes were loss-making.

In mid-March 2020, Jetstar suspended their New Zealand operations in response to the global COVID-19 pandemic. On 15 August, Jetstar suspended its domestic operations in New Zealand after the Government implemented social distancing rules in response to a second outbreak in Auckland that month. The airline attracted criticism after it refused to offer cash refunds to passengers whose flights were affected by the cancellation, instead offering travel vouchers or to change dates.

In mid-September 2020, Jetstar announced that it was resuming domestic flights in New Zealand after the New Zealand Government eliminated physical distancing requirements on aircraft.

Destinations

Codeshare agreements
Jetstar Airways has codeshare agreements with the following airlines:

 American Airlines
 Emirates
 Fiji Airways
 Finnair
 Japan Airlines
 Jeju Air
 Jin Air
 LATAM Chile
 LOT Polish Airlines
 Qantas

Fleet

Current fleet
, the Jetstar Airways fleet consists of the following aircraft:

Fleet development 
Qantas placed an order for 110 A320s in 2011, with 11 allocated to a planned new Qantas Group premium airline in Asia (never actually established) and 99 to various Jetstar-branded airlines including Jetstar Hong Kong, which received aircraft but never commenced operations. The order consisted of 32 A320ceos and 78 A320neos, with scope to convert some to A321s. In 2014, Qantas ordered another 21 A320neos, taking the total on order to 99. Some of the A320neo orders were converted to A321neos, with 54 A320neos and 45 A321neos being on order as of 2017. As of 2016, the operator or operators of the A320neos and A321neos (Jetstar group airline or airlines, or Qantas mainline) remained unspecified. In February 2018 eighteen of the orders were converted to A321LRs to allow Jetstar Airways to deploy some of its Boeing 787s onto other routes. On 19 June 2019, at the Paris Air Show, Qantas Group converted 26 A321Neo orders to the A321XLR and 10 A321neo to the A321LR. In addition 10 further A321XLRs were ordered. Total orders for the A320neo family are now 109: 45 A320neos, 28 A321LRs, and 36 A321XLR. How these planes will be distributed throughout the Qantas Group has not been announced; some of the A321XLRs have been earmarked for Qantas by CEO Alan Joyce. The rest of the aircraft will be allocated to their Jetstar subsidiaries.

Former fleet
Jetstar formerly operated the following aircraft:

Marketing and sponsorship
From 2004 to 2006, the airline's mascot, Julie The Jetstar Girl, was played by actress Magda Szubanski.

The advertising slogan of Jetstar is "All day every day low fares". In 2006, the jingle "Let's Fly Jetstar tonight" and the use of Szubanski ceased and was replaced with "It's All About Choice / Fly Away" (later "Low Fares, Good Time").

Jetstar Airways was the major sponsor of the National Rugby League team, the Gold Coast Titans from 2008 until 2012. In July 2008 Jetstar Airways was named the Official Airline of the Australian national rugby league team. One of its A320s was decorated with special decals to advertise the relationship.

In-flight service
On all domestic routes Jetstar has a buy on board single class service offering food and drinks for purchase.

On all Boeing 787 international routes, Jetstar offers a two-class service.

Business Class
Jetstar offers Business Class on its B787-8 aircraft. The Business Class cabin is fitted with 21 leather premium class seats in a 2-3-2 configuration, similar to Qantas domestic Business Class or Qantas international premium economy class. The service is inclusive of all meals and beverages, in-flight entertainment, and includes an increased baggage allowance of 30 kg. Business Max fares also include Qantas Club lounge access where available, and earn Qantas Frequent Flyer points.

Economy Class
Jetstar offers either pre-purchased meals on wheels or buy on board service with food and beverages.

In-flight entertainment

The airline has an eponymously named inflight magazine. In November 2011, Jetstar became the first airline to offer passengers iPads for use as in-flight entertainment devices. The units, which are pre-loaded with movies, games, and magazines, are provided on flights over two hours duration and are available for a fee in Economy Class but are complimentary in the international Business Class cabin, although some aircraft have seat back entertainment screens. The options available are changed on a bi-monthly basis depending on customer feedback forms which are collected by head office through a random selection process.

Jetstar's Boeing 787 aircraft are fitted with 10-inch seat-back on-demand entertainment screens in business class and 9-inch screens in economy class.

Television series

The Nine Network began airing the series Going Places from October 2007. The eight-part series depicted the everyday lives of selected members of Jetstar's Melbourne airport staff. The show followed the dramas of the check-in staff mid-flight, and new international recruits.

Jetstar Group

In addition to owning 100% of Jetstar Airways in Australia (also operating in New Zealand), the Qantas Group owns varying stakes in other Jetstar-branded airlines in the Asia-Pacific region. These airlines represent a strategy to provide better growth for the Qantas Group by accessing the intra-Asia market: exploiting both its faster growth and/or its under-penetration by low-cost airlines.

Qantas partners with local investors as both a means to overcome foreign ownership or traffic rights restrictions and to keep the ventures "capital light", i.e. reduce the capital investment required by Qantas and keep assets such as aircraft off the Qantas balance sheet.

From 2008 to 2020, the Group also consisted of Jetstar Pacific, a Vietnamese subsidiary which is also co-owned by Vietnam Airlines (nearly 70%). However, since July 2020, this carrier left the Jetstar Group and rebranded to Pacific Airlines.

The Jetstar Group consists of the following airlines:
The Jetstar Group is headed by CEO Gareth Evans.

 The final two aircraft (9V-VLA and 9V-VLB) were transferred from the Valuair AOC to the Jetstar Asia Airways AOC (as 9V-VLE and 9V-VLF) during April 2010. Although Jetstar Asia Airways generally maintains two aircraft in a hybrid Jetstar/Valuair livery, they sit on the Jetstar Asia Airways AOC.

 The Jetstar financial results include Jetstar Airways, Jetstar Asia Airways and Valuair as consolidated entities in the Qantas Group accounts. Despite Qantas owning only a minority stake in Jetstar Asia Airways and Valuair (51% owned and effectively controlled by Singaporean nationals as required under Singapore aviation regulations), Australian accounting standards have required them to be treated as consolidated entities since 8 April 2009. Jetstar Pacific Airlines and Jetstar Japan are treated as investments in associates and not consolidated in the Qantas Group accounts.

References

External links

 

Jetstar Airways mobile website
Jetstar Magazine 

Airlines based in Melbourne
Qantas
Low-cost carriers
Airlines established in 2003
Australian brands
Australian companies established in 2003